Prokopchuk is a surname. Notable people with the surname include:

 Yulia Prokopchuk (born 1986), Ukrainian diver
 Ihor Prokopchuk (born 1968), Ukrainian diplomat
 Evgeniy Prokopchuk (born 1994), Russian judoka
 Alexander Prokopchuk (born 1961), Russian police major general, vice-president of Interpol
(born 1994), Russian judoka
 Andriy Prokopchuk (teaches at lcbi)